Lone Grove is a city in Carter County, Oklahoma, United States. The population was 5,054 at the 2010 census. It is part of the Micropolitan Statistical Area of Ardmore.

History
Lone Grove is built on the site of a former village located in Pickens County, Chickasaw Nation in the Indian Territory, near a stand of cedar trees. The town was founded and a post office was established in Lone Grove on February 4, 1885. Prior to that the community was named "Price's Store", after local general mercantile owner Dayton " Big Spicy" James.  A fire destroyed many of the Lone Grove businesses and some homes on February 30, 1899.

The city's population was reported at 215 in a 1905 geological survey of the territory.  During the early 1900s local businesses included three grocery stores, a barbershop, a drugstore, a movie theater, a blacksmith shop, and three doctors. Numerous oil pools, including the Healdton and Hewitt fields, were discovered nearby during the 1910s and 1920s, and the Oklahoma, New Mexico and Pacific Railway reached town in 1913. (Popularly called the Ringling Railroad for financial backer John Nicholas Ringling, the line was later acquired by the Atchison, Topeka and Santa Fe Railway and was abandoned in 1976.)  During the 1920s the community grew with the addition of a two-story Masonic Lodge building, a wagonyard, a restaurant, a grist mill, a cleaning and press shop, and an automobile garage and gasoline filling station.

February 2009 tornado

On February 10, 2009, a tornado killed eight people in Lone Grove. According to the Lone Grove city manager 114 mobile homes were destroyed, and 46 people were injured.

The tornado occurred at 7:30 p.m. (CST) killing 8 and leaving 14 seriously injured. Seven were killed in Lone Grove, and the other was a truck driver passing through the area. Although tornadoes are not new to the area, they are very unusual in February, and many residents were caught off guard, despite the tornado sirens. According to the National Weather Service since 1950, the state has been struck by 44 tornadoes in the month of February.

Geography
Lone Grove is located south of the geographic center of Carter County, at  (34.177474, -97.248666). U.S. Highway 70 runs through the center of town, leading east  to Ardmore, the county seat, and west  to Waurika.

Demographics

As of the census of 2000, there were 4,631 people, 1,673 households, and 1,345 families residing in the city. The population density was 165.0 people per square mile (63.7/km2). There were 1,873 housing units at an average density of 66.7 per square mile (25.8/km2). The racial makeup of the city was 84.50% White, 1.86% African American, 7.90% Native American, 0.15% Asian, 0.11% Pacific Islander, 0.52% from other races, and 4.97% from two or more races. Hispanic or Latino of any race were 1.97% of the population.

There were 1,673 households, out of which 43.8% had children under the age of 18 living with them, 65.2% were married couples living together, 11.6% had a female householder with no husband present, and 19.6% were non-families. 17.0% of all households were made up of individuals, and 6.0% had someone living alone who was 65 years of age or older. The average household size was 2.76 and the average family size was 3.11.

In the city, the population was spread out, with 30.9% under the age of 18, 8.4% from 18 to 24, 30.2% from 25 to 44, 21.6% from 45 to 64, and 8.9% who were 65 years of age or older. The median age was 33 years. For every 100 females, there were 100.5 males. For every 100 females age 18 and over, there were 93.6 males.

The median income for a household in the city was $31,846, and the median income for a family was $38,800. Males had a median income of $30,365 versus $17,598 for females. The per capita income for the city was $13,125. About 14.0% of families and 15.0% of the population were below the poverty line, including 18.0% of those under age 18 and 18.8% of those age 65 or over.

References

Cities in Carter County, Oklahoma
Cities in Oklahoma
Ardmore, Oklahoma micropolitan area